This is a list of people with the given name Andrew.

Saints 
In the Christian Bible, Saint Andrew was the earliest disciple of Jesus and one of the twelve Apostles.

Other saints named Andrew include:
Saint Andrew of Trier (died 235), Bishop of Trier
Saints Peter, Andrew, Paul, and Denise, 3rd-century martyrs of the Eastern Orthodox and Catholic Churches
Saint Andrew of Crete (c. 650–712 or 726 or 740), archbishop, theologian, homilist, and hymnographer
Saint Andrew of Crete (martyr) (died 766/7)
Saint Andrew the Fool (died 936), Byzantine saint of the Eastern Orthodox Church
Saints Andrew Dũng-Lạc (1795–1839), Andrew Thong Kim Nguyen, Andrew Trong Van Tram, and Andrew Tuong of the Vietnamese Martyrs
Saint Andrew Kim Taegon (1821–1846), of the Korean Martyrs

Royalty and nobility
Andrew I of Hungary (c. 1015–1060)
Andrew Tanca (fl. mid-11th century), Judge of Logudoro
Andrew of Gaeta (died 1113), Duke of Gaeta
Andrew of Rupecanina (fl. mid-12th century), Italo-Norman noble, duke of Rupecanina
Andrew II of Hungary (c. 1177–1235)
Andrew of Hungary, Prince of Halych (died 1233/4)
Andrew, son of Serafin (died 1241), Hungarian baron and landowner
Andrew III of Hungary (c. 1265–1301)
Andrew, Duke of Slavonia (1268–1278), son of Stephen V of Hungary
Andrew of Arborea (died 1308), Giudice of Arborea
Andrew of Galicia (died 1323), last King of Ruthenia
Andrew, Duke of Calabria (1327–1345), son of Charles I of Hungary
Margrave Andrew of Burgau (1558–1600), Austrian noble and Roman Catholic cardinal
Prince Andrew of Greece and Denmark (1882–1944), paternal grandfather and namesake of Prince Andrew, Duke of York
Edward VIII of the United Kingdom (1894–1972), bore the name Andrew
Prince Andrew Romanoff (1923–2021), Russian American artist and author; grand-nephew of Nicholas II
Prince Andrew of Yugoslavia (1929–1990), youngest child of King Alexander I
Prince Andrew, Duke of York (born 1960), second son of Elizabeth II

Medieval figures
Andrew the Scot (died c. 877), Irish-born student and assistant of St. Donatus
Andrew the Scythian (died after 887), Byzantine military officer in the Arab–Byzantine wars
Andrew, Bishop of Veszprém (fl. 11th century), Hungarian prelate
Andrew of Fleury (fl. 11th century), Christian monk and historian
Andrew of Saint Victor (died 1175), Augustinian canon of the abbey of Saint Victor in Paris, Christian Hebraist, and biblical exegete
Andrew, Archbishop of Kalocsa (died 1186)
Andrew of Hungary (historian) (fl. 1270)
Andrew of London (died c. 1278), Bishop of Winchester elect
Andrew of Cornwall (fl. 1290s), English philosopher at Oxford
Andrew, Bishop of Győr (died 1294/5), Hungarian bishop
Andrew, Archbishop of Antivari (fl. early 14th century)
Andrew de Buchan (died c. 1304), Scottish Cistercian, bishop of Caithness
Andrew, Bishop of Eger (died 1305/6), Hungarian bishop
Andrew of Perugia (died c. 1332), Italian Franciscan friar and bishop
Andrew of Wyntoun (c. 1350–c. 1425), Scottish poet, canon, and prior

Renaissance figures
Andrew of Rhodes (died 1440), Greek Dominican theologian
Andrew of Carniola (1399–1484), Roman Catholic archbishop
Andrew of Montereale (c. 1403–1479), Italian Roman Catholic priest and member of the Order of Saint Augustine
 Master Andrew of Bristol (d. 1521), the sole Englishman in the Magellan Expedition
Andrew of Phu Yen (1624–1644), known as the "Protomartyr of Vietnam"
Andrew of Totma (fl. 17th century), Russian Orthodox Church religious figure

Others

A 
Andrew Abercromby, Scottish biomedical engineer and aquanaut

B 
Andrew Bailey (disambiguation), several people
Andrew Barnett (born 1968), director of the UK Branch of the Calouste Gulbenkian Foundation
Andrew Bashaija, Ugandan lawyer
Andrew Batterley (born 1976), English cricketer
Andrew Bayer, American DJ and Grammy-nominated record producer
Andrew Bayes, American football player
Andrew Beck (born 1996), American football player
Andrew Bellatti, American baseball player
Andrew Benintendi, American baseball player
Andy Biersack, lead vocalist of American rock band Black Veil Brides
Andrew Bird, American musician
Andrew Bloom, American Olympic shot putter
Andrew Bogut, Australian basketball player
Andrew Brereton (1827–1885), Welsh writer
Andrew Briggs, British scientist
Andrew Brokos (born 1982), professional poker player, instructor, author and coach
Andrew Brown (disambiguation), several people
Andrew Brunette, Canadian ice hockey player
Andrew Buckley, New Zealand field hockey player
Andrew Bynum, American basketball player

C 
Andrew Campbell (outfielder), Australian baseball player
Andrew Carnegie, American steel magnate and philanthropist
Andrew Chafin, American baseball player
Andrew Crichton (1910–1995), British shipping industrialist
Andrew Colvin, Australian policeman and commissioner
Andrew Craig, American mixed martial arts fighter
Andrew Dice Clay, American comedian and actor
Andrew Dost, American musician and singer
Andrew Clayton, British swimmer
Andrew Cole, English footballer
Andrew Cuomo, 56th Governor of New York
Andrew Cunanan (1969–1997), Filipino-American serial killer

D 
Andrew Davenport (born 1965), English actor, puppeteer, voice actor, music composer
Andrew Davidson (disambiguation), several people
Andrew Davies (disambiguation), several people
Andrew Davis (disambiguation), several people
Andrew Dawson (record producer), American music producer, engineer, mixer and songwriter
Andy Dawson (born 1978), English footballer
Andy Dawson (born 1979), English footballer
Andrew Demeter, American political activist, filmmaker and journalist
Andrew De Silva (born 1974), Sri Lankan Australian rock vocalist
Andrew Digby, British-born astronomer and bird ecologist working in New Zealand
Andrew Jackson Donelson, American diplomat, nephew of Andrew Jackson
Andrew Dunn (disambiguation), several people

E 

Andrew Ford Espiritu a.k.a. Andrew E., Filipino hip hop artist, actor, TV host

F 
Andrew J. Feustel, American astronaut
Andrew Flintoff, English cricketer and TV personality
Andrew Rube Foster, Hall of Fame manager for baseball's Negro leagues
Andrew Friedman, American, baseball general manager
Andrew Fletcher, English musician and member of English band Depeche Mode

G 
Andrew Garfield, American-British actor
Andrew Gaze, Australian basketball player
Andy Gibb (Andrew Roy Gibb), English pop singer and composer
Andrew Giuliani (born 1986), American Special Assistant to the President for President Trump
Andrew Gillum, 125th Mayor of Tallahassee, Florida
Andrew Gold (1951–2011), American musician
Andrew Gower (disambiguation), several people
Andrew Graham (disambiguation), several people
Andrew Graham-Dixon, British art historian and broadcaster
Andy Griffith, American actor/singer/comedian
Andrew Grove, American businessman/engineer/author and a science pioneer
Andrew Guinand (1912–1987), Australian mathematician

H  
Andrew Harris (disambiguation), several people
Andrew Harrison (disambiguation), several people
Andrew Hastie, Australian politician
Andrew Hastie (field hockey), New Zealand field hockey player
Andrew Heafitz, American inventor
Andrew Heaney, American baseball player
Andrew Holness (born 1972), Jamaican politician and current prime minister of Jamaica
Andrew Horowitz, American songwriter, producer, and recording artist
Andrew Hussie, artist at MS Paint Adventures
Andrew Huxley (1917–2012), English physiologist and biophysicist

J 
Andrew Jackson, American general and politician, 7th President of the United States of America
Andrew Jackson Sr., father of Andrew Jackson
Andrew Jacobs (disambiguation), several people
Andrew Jacobson, Major League Soccer player
Andrew Jayamanne, Sri Lankan film director
Andrew Johns, Australian rugby league player and broadcaster
Andrew Johnson (disambiguation), several people, including:
Andrew Johnson, 17th President of the United States of America
Andrew Johnston (disambiguation), several people

K 
Andrew Kamarck (died 2010), American economist
Andy Kaufman, American comedian and actor
Andrew Kennedy (disambiguation), several people
Andrew Kittredge, American baseball player
Andrew Knapp, American baseball player
Andrew Knizner, American baseball player
Andrew Knott, English actor
Andrew Kumarage, 3rd Anglican Bishop of Kurunegala

L 
Andrew Ladd, Canadian ice hockey player
Andrew Laine, American engineer
Andrew Lang (1844–1912), Scottish poet, novelist and literary critic
Andrew Lanham, American film screenwriter
Andrew-Lee Potts, English actor/director
Andrej Lemanis, Australian basketball coach
Andrew Lincoln, British actor
Andrew Lloyd Webber, English composer and impresario
Andrew Lorraine, American baseball player
Andrew Luck, American football player
Andrew Luri, Sudanese-Australian actor

M 
Andrej Mangold, German basketball player
Andrew Marr, British broadcaster
Andrew Marvell (1621–1678), English Metaphysical poet, satirist and politician
Andrew McCullough, Australian Rugby League player
Andrew McCutchen, American baseball player
Andrew Mehrtens, New Zealand rugby union player
Andrew Mellon, American businessman, philanthropist and politician
Andrew Mercier, Canadian politician
Andrew Mercer (disambiguation), several people
Andrew Micallef, Maltese painter and musician
Andrew Miller (disambiguation), several people
Andrew Mlangeni, South African politician
Andrew Monteiro (born 1992), Brazilian footballer
Andrew Morgado, American actor, voice actor, ADR mixer and sound editor
Andrew Murray, British tennis player

N 
Andrew Nabbout, Australian association football player
Andrew Nardi, American baseball player
Andrew Neil, Scottish political journalist and broadcaster

O 
Andrew O'Keefe, Australian TV personality
Andrew Oates (born 1969), Australian and British biologist
Andrew Oye (born 1974), Canadian composer

P 
Andrew Clennel Palmer, British engineer
Andrew David Perkins (born 1978), American music educator
Andrew Provence, American football player

R 
Andrew Rader, Canadian author and aerospace engineer
Andrew S. Rappaport (born 1957), American businessperson, philanthropist 
Andrew Raycroft, Canadian ice hockey player
Andy Richter, American actor/writer/comedian
Andrew Ridgeley, English musician, George Michael's partner in Wham!
Andrew Robertson, Scottish footballer
Andrew Robinson (disambiguation), several people
Andy Roddick, American tennis player
Andrew J. Roger, Canadian-Australian molecular biologist
Andrew Rowell (born 1982), British filmmaker
Andrew Rushbury (born 1983), English footballer

S 
Andrew Sabiston, Canadian voice actor
Andrew Sachs (1930–2016), British character actor
Andrew Salgado (born 1982), Canadian artist
Andrew Schulz, American comedian
Andrew Sega, American musician
Andrew "Andy" Shernoff, songwriter/guitarist for the pre-punk band The Dictators
Andrew Shue, American actor
Andrew Slattery, Irish rally car driver
Andrew Stahl (born 1952), American television and film actor
Andrew Stanton, American animator, storyboard artist, film director, and screenwriter
Andrew Stevovich, American visual artist
Andrew Stockdale, guitarist and singer of Wolfmother
Andrew Symonds (1975–2022), Australian cricketer
Andrew Sznajder (born 1967), English-born Canadian tennis player

T 
Andrew Tan (born 1952), Chinese-Filipino billionaire and business magnate
Andrew S. Tanenbaum, American-Dutch computer scientist
Andrew Tate, British-American martial artist
Andrew Thompson (disambiguation), multiple people
Andrew Tiller (born 1989), American football player
Andrew Timlin, New Zealand field hockey player
Andrew Toles, American baseball player
Andrew Toney, American basketball player

U 
Andrew Unger (born 1979), Canadian writer

V 
Andrew Van Ginkel (born 1997), American football player
Andy Van Slyke, American baseball player
Andrew VanWyngarden, American musician
Andrew Vasquez, Native American flute player
Andrew Vasquez (baseball), American baseball player
Andrew Vaughn (born 1998), American baseball player
Andrew Velazquez (born 1994), American baseball player
Andrew Vollert (born 1995), American football player
Andrew Vorhees (born 1999), American football player

W 
Andrew W.K., American singer-songwriter, multi-instrumentalist, entertainer, and motivational speaker
Andrew Wade, American sound engineer and producer
Andrew Wagner, American film director
Andrew Wakefield, British anti-vaccine activist
Andrew Walcott (born 1975), former English and GB sprinter
Andrew Walter, American football player
Andrew Wantz, American baseball player
Andy Warhol, American pop artist
Andrew West (disambiguation), several people
Andrew Wiles, British mathematician, proved Fermat's Last Theorem
Andrew Wiggins, Canadian basketball player
Andrew Wingard (born 1996), American football player
Andrew Wood (disambiguation), several people
Andrew Wyeth, American visual artist

Y 
Andrew Yang, American entrepreneur, philanthropist, lawyer, and 2020 presidential candidate

Z 
Andrew Zydney (born 1958(?)), American chemical engineer

Fictional characters 
 Andrew, angel of death from Touched by an Angel
 Andrew, robot from Isaac Asimov's 1976 novella The Bicentennial Man and its 1999 film adaptation
 Andrew "Andy" Baker, in the Netflix series 13 Reasons Why 
 Andrew Beckett, from the film Philadelphia
 Andrew "Andre" Harris, one of the main characters from Victorious
Andrei Nikolayevich Bolkonsky, central character in Leo Tolstoy's novel War and Peace
Andy Botwin from the TV series Weeds
Andy Bernard, from the TV series The Office
 Andy Davis, from Disney Pixar's Toy Story and its sequels
 Andy Dufresne, from the Stephen King novel Rita Hayworth and Shawshank Redemption and the film adaption The Shawshank Redemption
Andy Dwyer, from the TV series Parks and Recreation
 Andrew Glouberman, from Big Mouth
Andrew Kreiss, in the video game Identity V
Andrew Ryan, from the video game BioShock
 Andrew "Drew" Torres, from Degrassi: The Next Generation
 Andrew Fillier, in the film Cyberbully
 Andrew Hanbridge, in the anime series Little Witch Academia
Andrew Wiggin aka Ender Wiggin, the title character from Orson Scott Card's science fiction novel Ender's Game

See also
Andruw, given name
Drew (name)

Andrew